The chestnut-capped flycatcher (Erythrocercus mccallii) is a species of bird in the family Erythrocercidae.

Distribution and habitat
It is found in Angola, Cameroon, Central African Republic, Republic of the Congo, Democratic Republic of the Congo, Ivory Coast, Equatorial Guinea, Gabon, Ghana, Guinea, Liberia, Mali, Nigeria, Sierra Leone, and Uganda.
Its natural habitats are subtropical or tropical swamps and subtropical or tropical moist montane forests.

Subspecies
E. m. mccallii: Southeast Nigeria to Cameroon, Gabon and Democratic Republic of the Congo
E. m. nigeriae: Sierra Leone to Guinea and southwest Nigeria
E. m. congicus: East and south Democratic Republic of the Congo to w Uganda

References

chestnut-capped flycatcher
Birds of Sub-Saharan Africa
chestnut-capped flycatcher
Taxonomy articles created by Polbot